The 2013 FIFA Beach Soccer World Cup qualifiers for UEFA is a beach soccer tournament that was played in Moscow, Russia from 1 – 8 July 2012. It determined the four teams that would qualify for the 2013 FIFA Beach Soccer World Cup in Papeete, Tahiti. All matches were played on two temporary stadium courts at Victory Park at Poklonnaya Hill in Moscow.

Participating teams and draw 
24 teams confirmed their participation in the qualifying tournament:

The draw to divide the 24 teams into six groups of four was conducted on 9 June 2012.

Group stage 
All kickoff times are of local time in Moscow (UTC+04:00).

Group A

Group B

Group C

Group D

Group E

Group F

Playoff stage 
All kickoff times are of local time in Moscow (UTC+04:00).

Round of 16 

For the first time in the FIFA Beach Soccer World Cup UEFA Qualifying tournament, a straight knockout stage was not used. Instead, the eight winners of the Round of 16 were divided into two groups of four. The compositions of the groups were formed on the basis of the composite ranking based on the results of the first group stage and the Round of 16.

Group G consisted of the Round of 16 winners with the 1st, 4th, 5th and 8th best records, while Group H consisted of the Round of 16 winners with the 2nd, 3rd, 6th and 7th best records. The group winners would play in the final, while the second-place teams would play for third place. In any event, the top two teams in each group would qualify for the 2013 FIFA Beach Soccer World Cup.

Group G

Group H

Third place play off

Final

Winners

Awards

Teams Qualifying

Goalscorers 

14 goals
  B. Saganowski
13 goals
  D. Shishin
12 goals
  A. Makarov
11 goals
  D. Stankovic
10 goals
  M. Pagis
9 goals
  R. Amarelle
  J. Basquaise
8 goals
  D. Rawidjan
  R. Pachev
7 goals
  P. Stratis
  N. Belchior
  J. Torres
  W. Ziober
  I. Leonov
  E. Eriten
  A. Borsuk
  O. Zborovskyi
6 goals
  V. Bokach
  I. Bryshtsel
  F. Besenyei
  Madjer
5 goals
  M. Chalupa
  M. van Gessel
  P. Friszkemut
  J. Lima
  A. Aceiton
  K. Ismail
4 goals
  R. Ilyin
  S. François
  I. Iloz
  M. Ughy
  V. Fekete
  P. Jaksa
  L. Koswal
  P. Tosch
  Antonio
  C. Torres
  M. Rodrigues
  A. Korniychuk
3 goals
  I. Miranovich
  A. Karpov
  J. Kovarik
  A. Saharov
  D. Samoun
  T. Triantafyllidis
  Y. Badash
  G. Gori
  A. Dombrovskis

  C. van den Ouweland
  D. Baran
  I. Gândac
  M. Posteuca
  E. Eremeev
  E. Shaykov
  J. Santos
  Kuman
2 goals
  Elvin Guliyev
  E. Kurduv
  A. Zeynal
  I. Konstantinov
  I. Trofimov
  K. Tsvetkov
  D. Filinger
  P. Stejskal
  T. Hurab
  L. Karda
  T. Bowes
  A. Aniko
  F. Mendy
  O. Romrig
  S. Ullrich
  S. Gkritzalis
  S. Badaklik
  A. Danin
  P. Palmacci
  D. Maradona
  G. Soria
  D. Ramaciotti
  S. Marinai
  F. Corosiniti
  S. Vasiljevs
  P. Ax
  H. Salveson
  J. Jakobsen
  T.-R. Sorensen
  D. Słowiński
  P. Golański
  B. Novo
  A. Cavalcanti
  Maci
  Y. Krashenninikov
  D. Pajon
  S. Spaccarotella
  S. Meier
  M. Jaeggy
  P. Borer
  Tamer Ay
  A. Butko
  A. Yevdokymov
1 goal
  Elhad Guliyev
  V. Borisov
  O. Mammadov
  A. Ali
  E. Akhmadov
  A. Aliyev
  A. Elhad
  A. Davidovich
  V. Krupitsa

  P. Shvayba
  S. Hristov
  F. Filipov
  M. Kubice
  M. Bocek
  M. Evans
  G. Funnell
  Galkin
  T. Tammo
  M. Lukk
  I. Siska
  D. Fort
  J.-M. Edouard
  I. Delaportas
  D. Raptis
  K. Papastathopoulos
  N. Bertsias
  P. Abel
  T. Weisz
  A. Levi
  A. Nakache
  A. Yatim
  R. Pasquali
  M. Leghissa
  O. Kravchenko
  R. Istrati
  D. Coicev
  V. Budigai
  A. Negara
  V. Baesu
  R. Ran
  F. van der Geest
  D. Summerville
  R. Liefden
  E. Hansen
  M. Widzicki
  K. Grzegorczyk
  D. Burzawa
  L. Vaz
  L. Chirila
  R. Cărăuleanu
  A. Tănase
  L. Croituru
  A. Shkarin
  D. Ippolitov
  Y. Gorchinskiy
  Sidi
  C. Mendes
  F. Donaire
  D. Ziegler
  A. Schirinzi
  Y. Ergun
  A. Sezer
  O. Zayim
  K. Andrieiev
  J. Lima
  A. Cherevko
Own goals
  I. Gândac (playing against France)
  S. Abu (playing against Netherlands)
  K. Grzegorczyk (playing against Azerbaijan)
  I. Bryshtsel (playing against Russia)

External links 
 FIFA Beach Soccer World Cup 2013 – Moscow Qualifier Video

References 

Qualification Uefa
International association football competitions hosted by Russia
2013
Beach soccer in Russia
2012 in beach soccer
2012–13 in Russian football